Qapıçay is a municipality and village in the Qakh Rayon of Azerbaijan. It has a population of 332. Qapıçay is nearby to Zarna, Gyullyuk and Gora Arpat’yandag. It has an elevation of 266 meters.

References
https://mapcarta.com/29683742

Populated places in Qakh District